Voila! is the third studio album by Italian singer In-Grid. It was released in 2005, and it featured songs on French and English. An English vocal album was also released.

Track listing 
 Mama Mia - 3:40
 Le Coquin - 3:28
 Dans Tes Yeux - 3:39
 Click Clock - 3:43
 L'Amoureuse - 3:46
 Oui - 3:06
 Jamais Eu - 3:11
 À Poings Fermés - 3:04
 Où Est Ma Vie? - 3:36
 Encore Une Fois - 3:08
 C'est Pour Toi - 3:38

English version 
 Mama Mia (English Version) - 3:40
 Karma Fields - 3:31
 Poison In Your Mind - 3:41
 Tic Toc - 3:45
 One More Time - 3:10
 Raining In Your Heart - 3:48
 The Slave - 3:05
 I Was Happy - 3:12
 If - 3:06
 Love Out Of Time - 4:07
 Say You're Mine - 3:37
 You Kissed Me - 3:09
 Really Really Wanna - 3:41
 Every Night - 4:32
 Come Back Home - 3:39

Certifications

References

External links 
In-Grid official site
Voila! album
In-Grid - Voila! album

2005 albums
In-Grid albums
Italian-language albums